Big Spring Bog Natural Area Preserve is a  Natural Area Preserve located in Grayson County, Virginia.  The terrain is hilly, and within its borders is Chestnut Creek, a tributary of the New River.  The preserve features a rare wetland known as a "cranberry glade".

The preserve is owned and maintained by the Virginia Department of Conservation and Recreation, and is open to public visitation only through prior arrangement with a state-employed land steward.

See also
 Cranberry Glades
 List of Virginia Natural Area Preserves
 List of Virginia state forests
 List of Virginia state parks

References

External links
Virginia Department of Conservation and Recreation: Big Spring Bog Natural Area Preserve

Virginia Natural Area Preserves
Protected areas of Grayson County, Virginia